Kepler-51 is a Sun-like star that is only about 500 million years old. It is orbited by three super-puff planets—Kepler-51b, c, and d—which have the lowest known densities of any exoplanet. The planets are all Jupiter-sized but with masses only a few times Earth's.

Planets 

Kepler-51 has three planets, all super-puffs. Kepler-51b, c and d have some of the lowest known densities of any exoplanet.

References

Further reading
Kepler-51 is Home to Three Super-Puff Exoplanets, Sci-News, Dec 20, 2019 by Natali Anderson

G-type main-sequence stars
Solar analogs
Planetary systems with three confirmed planets
Cygnus (constellation)